Meganoton analis, the grey double-bristled hawkmoth, is a moth of the family Sphingidae. It is known from India, Nepal, southern and eastern China, northern Thailand, northern Vietnam, Peninsular Malaysia, Indonesia, Taiwan, the southern part of the Russian Far East (Kurile Islands), South Korea and Japan.

Description 
The wingspan is 87–150 mm.

Biology 
The adults of subspecies M. a. scribae are on wing from early June to early August in Korea.

The larvae have been recorded feeding on Sassafras tzuma in China. It is also an occasional pest of Magnolia species. The larvae of subspecies M. a. scribae have been recorded feeding on Magnolia kobus in Japan.

Subspecies
Meganoton analis analis (India, Nepal, southern China, northern Thailand and northern Vietnam)
Meganoton analis gressitti Clark, 1937 (Taiwan)
Meganoton analis scribae (Austaut, 1911) (southern Russian Far East (Kuril Islands), eastern China, South Korea and Japan)
Meganoton analis sugii Cadiou & Holloway, 1989 (Sulawesi)
Meganoton analis sumatranus Clark, 1924 (Borneo, Sumatra)

References

Meganoton
Moths described in 1874
Moths of Japan